Hukam Singh Phogat (28 February 1926 – 26 February 2015) was an Indian politician and served as Chief Minister of the state of Haryana from 1990 to 1991. Before Chief Minister he had been elected MLA from Charkhi Dadri three times.

Early life and education 
Hukam Singh was born on 28 February 1926 at Charkhi Dadri, Haryana (then Bhiwani district, Punjab (British India) to a Hindu Jat family.

Political career 
Hukam Singh was elected as MLA first time in 1977 from Dadri, during this time he was also given a ministry. Later on he was elected MLA twice in 1982 and 1987. Being in Janata Dal he was Chief minister from July, 1990 to March, 1991 and twice as Deputy Chief Minister of Haryana.

References

Chief Ministers of Haryana
V. P. Singh administration
People from Bhiwani district
People from Bhiwani
Deputy chief ministers of Haryana
State cabinet ministers of Haryana
1926 births
2015 deaths
Chief ministers from Janata Dal
Janata Dal politicians
Janata Party politicians